Jan Boven (born 28 February 1972 in Delfzijl, Groningen) is a road bicycle racer from the Netherlands, who turned professional in 1996, and remained with the same team, Rabobank, until 2008.

Palmares
 Teleflex Tour – 1 stage (1996)
 2nd, Liège-Bastogne-Liège - U23 version (1991–1992)

References
 

1972 births
Living people
Dutch male cyclists
People from Delfzijl
UCI Road World Championships cyclists for the Netherlands
Cyclists from Groningen (province)